Walter Clive Bircham (born 7 September 1939 – 6 June 2020) was an English professional footballer who played as a winger for Sunderland.

References

1939 births
Living people
Footballers from Sunderland
English footballers
Association football wingers
Sunderland A.F.C. players
Hartlepool United F.C. players
Boston United F.C. players
English Football League players